Blankenberg is a village and a former municipality in the district Saale-Orla-Kreis, in Thuringia, Germany. Since 1 January 2019, it is part of the municipality Rosenthal am Rennsteig.

History
Within the German Empire (1871-1918), Blankenberg was part of the Prussian Province of Saxony.

References

Saale-Orla-Kreis
Former municipalities in Thuringia